StuRents.com is a dedicated student property search engine and tenancy management platform, operating across the UK. Launched in 2009, the site provides a user-generated ecosystem for advertising student accommodation to students and does not charge a fee for landlords or letting agents to list properties.

Background
StuRents was founded in 2008 and incorporated in 2009 by undergraduates studying at Durham University. The site currently lists 200,000 student bedspaces. In 2008, the company won the 2008 Digital Awards 'Best B2C'  and in 2009, StuRents.com was awarded the Blueprint Business Prize

StuRents.com was recently cited alongside Rightmove as a core accommodation website dedicated to helping students find the right accommodation for university.

External links
StuRents.com

References

British real estate websites
Property companies of the United Kingdom